21 teams entered in the 1966 FIFA World Cup qualification rounds for the African, Asian and Oceanian zone (Confederation of African Football, Asian Football Confederation and what later would become the Oceania Football Confederation). The entries of Congo and the Philippines were rejected.

South Africa, which had been moved to the Asia/Oceania zone, was disqualified in September 1965 after being previously suspended by FIFA due to apartheid, and all fifteen African zone teams withdrew in protest in October 1964 after FIFA, citing competitive and logistical issues, confirmed that there would be no direct qualification for an African team.

South Korea were subsequently forced to withdraw on 2 November 1965 due to logistical difficulties after the three-team tournament was moved from Japan to Cambodia, leaving only Australia and North Korea to contest the final place: North Korea easily won both legs to qualify.

Format
The plans were for four rounds of play:
Africa First Round: The 15 African teams were divided into six groups of two or three teams. The group winners would advance to the Second Round.
Africa Second Round: The six group winners were divided into three groups and would play against each other on a home-and-away basis. The winners would advance to the Final Round.
Asia–Oceania First Round: Australia, North Korea, South Africa and South Korea would play each other twice in a round-robin tournament at a neutral venue, originally scheduled to be in Japan but ultimately played in Cambodia.
Final Round: The Asia/Oceania winner would play the three African winners on a home-and-away basis. The winner would qualify.

Africa First Round

The original group draws were:

The Second Round pairings were scheduled as follows: Group 1 winners v Group 5 winners, Group 2 winners v Group 4 winners and Group 3 winners v Group 6 winners. These would be played home-and-away, with the winners advancing to the Final Round.

As all fifteen teams withdrew in protest after FIFA declined to allocate a direct qualifying place for an African team, the African First and Second Rounds were scratched.

Asia–Oceania First Round

Originally, this was scheduled as a four-team tournament between Australia, North Korea, South Africa and South Korea, to be played in Japan.

Before the tournament began, South Africa were disqualified after being suspended by FIFA due to apartheid, and South Korea were subsequently forced to withdraw due to logistical difficulties after the tournament was moved to Cambodia.

Further complicating matters, North Korea lacked diplomatic relations with most countries and did not have a FIFA-standard venue at the time, while Australian immigration laws then in force meant the North Korean team would be unlikely to receive visas to enter the country.

As such, finding a venue for the matches proved difficult until Head of State Norodom Sihanouk, an ally of Kim Il-sung, allowed the matches to be held in Phnom Penh.

North Korea won 9–2 on aggregate: as the Final Round was scratched due to the withdrawal of all African teams, North Korea also qualified.

Qualified teams
The following team from AFC qualified for the final tournament.

1 Bold indicates champions for that year. Italic indicates hosts for that year.

Goalscorers

3 goals

 Pak Seung-Zin

2 goals

 Les Scheinflug
 Han Bong-Zin
 Kim Seung-Il

1 goal

 Im Seung-Hwi
 Pak Doo-Ik

References

External links
1966 World Cup Qualification
RSSSF - 1966 World Cup Qualification

1966 FIFA World Cup qualification
FIFA World Cup qualification (CAF)
FIFA World Cup qualification (AFC)
FIFA World Cup qualification (OFC)
Qual
Qual
qual